This is the list of 143 notable stars in the constellation Aquila, sorted by decreasing brightness.

See also
List of stars by constellation

References

List
Aquila